Pioneer is an unincorporated community and census-designated place in Hendry County, Florida, United States. Its population was 752 as of the 2020 census.

Geography

Demographics

References

Unincorporated communities in Hendry County, Florida
Unincorporated communities in Florida
Census-designated places in Hendry County, Florida
Census-designated places in Florida